Halton Gill is a hamlet and civil parish in Littondale in the Yorkshire Dales in North Yorkshire, England. It is situated  up Littondale from Litton.  A minor road leads south west to Silverdale and Stainforth in Ribblesdale.

The name of the hamlet was recorded in 1457 as Haltonghyll. The name derives from a combination of Old English and Old Norse and means the nook of land (or ravine) with a small valley by a farmstead and a stream.

The civil parish includes the hamlets of Foxup and Hesleden. To the south the parish rises to the summits of Plover Hill and Pen-y-Ghent.  The population of the civil parish was estimated at 60 in 2012.

From Halton Gill there is a bridleway over the Horse Head Pass to the north east to Yockenthwaite in Langstrothdale. This path was used by the priest from Hubberholme to reach the small chapel in Halton Gill. To the west paths lead to the summit of Pen-y-ghent via Plover Hill.

The 2010 Sainsbury's Christmas advert with celebrity chef, Jamie Oliver, was filmed in Halton Gill. Also filmed in the same year, but not released until 2012, was the film The Woman in Black, which used Halton Gill for filming as the fictional village of Crythin Gifford.

Halton Gill was historically a township in the ancient parish of Arncliffe, part of Staincliffe Wapentake in the West Riding of Yorkshire.  Halton Gill became a separate civil parish in 1866.

The parish was transferred to the new county of North Yorkshire in 1974.

References

External links

Villages in North Yorkshire
Civil parishes in North Yorkshire